Rajpur Assembly constituency is one of 243 constituencies of legislative assembly of Bihar. It comes under Buxar Lok Sabha constituency.

Overview
Rajpur comprises community blocks of Rajpur & Itarhi; Gram Panchayats Ataon, Kanjharua, Mathila, Mugaon, Kasian & Koransarai of Dumraon CD Block.

Members of Legislative Assembly

Election results

2020

References

External links
 

Politics of Buxar district
Assembly constituencies of Bihar